George Seton (1822–1908) was a Scottish historian and philanthropist.

George Seton may also refer to:

George Seton, 3rd Lord Seton (1415–1478), Lord of Parliament, Lord Auditor, and Scottish ambassador
George Seton, 5th Lord Seton (died 1513), Scottish nobleman
George Seton, 6th Lord Seton (died 1549), Lord of the Parliament of Scotland
George Seton, 7th Lord Seton (1531–1586), Lord of the Parliament of Scotland
George Seton, 3rd Earl of Winton (1584–1650), Royalist and Cavalier
George Seton, Lord Seton (1613–1648)
George Seton, 4th Earl of Winton (c. 1641–1704), Scottish Royalist, Privy Councillor, and Sheriff of Haddingtonshire
George Seton, 5th Earl of Winton (1678–1749), Scottish nobleman